Sarah Page ( Saunders , 26 August 1863 – 20 January 1950), also known as Sarah Saunders Page, was a New Zealand teacher, feminist, prohibitionist, socialist, social reformer, and politician.

Biography
Sarah Saunders was born in Waimea South, Nelson, New Zealand in 1863. She was one of ten children of Rhoda Saunders (née Flower) and Alfred Saunders, a radical politician, and grew up surrounded by Quakers. In 1896, she married Samuel Page, who was a science demonstrator at Canterbury Museum and like herself a Quaker. They were to have two sons.

With Ada Wells, she was a dominating influence on the Canterbury Women's Institute. She was also active with the National Council of Women of New Zealand and was the organisation's secretary in 1905–06. She was an ardent critic of conscription and upset Prime Minister William Massey and the Minister of Internal Affairs, George Warren Russell, with her criticism. Her son Robin was a conscientious objector and was imprisoned in 1918.

Standing for the Labour Party, she failed to get elected to the Christchurch City Council in the 1919 local elections. The three candidates elected in the St Albans ward, which included John Beanland and Ernest Andrews, were all from the right-leaning Citizens Association. Page was elected to the North Canterbury Hospital Board in 1922. When the Labour Party developed into a strong party in the 1920s, Page's extreme left views became less accepted and her influence faded. She died in 1950 and is buried at Sydenham Cemetery next to her husband, who died in 1944.

References

1863 births
1950 deaths
New Zealand feminists
New Zealand activists
New Zealand women activists
New Zealand schoolteachers
19th-century New Zealand people
People from Nelson, New Zealand
New Zealand temperance activists
New Zealand socialists
New Zealand social reformers
Burials at Sydenham Cemetery
New Zealand Labour Party politicians
Members of district health boards in New Zealand
New Zealand Quakers
Quaker feminists
New Zealand socialist feminists
Quaker socialists